This is a list of notable Canadians of Hungarian descent:

 Eve Adams, Canadian liberal politician (2011-2015)
 Kati Agócs – composer
 Karoly Bezdek - mathematician
 Attila Buday – Olympic canoer
 Tamas Buday Jr. – Olympic canoer
 Julius T. Csotonyi – paleoartist and illustrator
 Andrea Horwath - politician
 George Jonas – writer, poet, and journalist
 Robert Lantos – film producer
 Miklós Lente - cinematographer
 Attila Richard Lukacs – artist
 Alanis Morissette – singer, actress, and musician
 Austin Pasztor - American football player
 William Shatner - Actor </ref>
 George Sipos – writer
 Shannon Szabados – ice hockey, goaltender for the Canadian national hockey team
 Aaron Voros – former professional ice hockey player
 Tom Wappel, Canadian liberal politician (1988-2008), staunch Social conservative
 Félix Lengyel or xQc, YouTuber and Livestreamer

References

Hungarian descent
List
Hungarian